Cherra redirects to Cherrapunji. 

It can also refer to:
Cherra, Hazaribagh, a census town in Jharkhand, India